James Bowen (died 1774) was an English painter and topographer. Bowen was a native of Shrewsbury, where he died. The antiquarian John Bowen was his son.

Works
He made a collection for a history of Shropshire, having taken church notes, sketches of monuments, transcripts of records, etc. when he was accompanying William Mytton through the county. One of Bowen's works is a view of the church of Mary in the Battlefield, Shrewsbury, and he produced also some maps.

Richard Gough bought all the genealogical and topographical materials which Bowen had amassed, and they formed part of the manuscripts and similar relics which Gough bequeathed to the Bodleian Library.

References

Attribution

Year of birth missing
1774 deaths
18th-century English painters
English male painters
Artists from Shrewsbury
English topographers
English antiquarians
18th-century English male artists